Rachel Choong (born 22 January 1994) is an English para badminton player who competes in international level events. She is the first English player to win three gold medals at a single world championships in 2015, she partners with Rebecca Bedford in the women's doubles and Andrew Martin in the mixed doubles at badminton competitions.

Achievements

World Championships 

Women's singles

Women's doubles

Mixed doubles

European Championships 
Women's singles

Women's doubles

Mixed doubles

References

Notes

External links 

 Rachel Choong at http://www.rachelchoong.com

1994 births
Living people
Sportspeople from Lancashire
English female badminton players
British para-badminton players